The 2023 St Kilda Football Club season is the 124th competing in the VFL/AFL and 138th in the club's history. Coached by Ross Lyon and captained by Jack Steele, they are competing in the AFL's 2023 Premiership Season.

Background

Squad changes

Retirements and delistings

Trade period

Free agency

National Draft

Category B rookie selections

Pre-season supplemental selection period

Coaching staff changes

Pre-season

Premiership season

League table

Result by round

Matches

Squad information

Playing and coaching staff list
The playing squad and coaching staff of the St Kilda Football Club for the 2023 AFL season as of 9 December 2022.

References

External links
 
 Listing of St Kilda games in 2023

St Kilda Football Club seasons
St Kilda
St Kilda